Ostap Yosypovych Nyzhankivsky ( and ); January 24, 1863 – May 22, 1919) – Ukrainian writer and cleric, a priest of the Ukrainian Greek Catholic Church, composer, conductor, and public figure.

Life 
Ostap Nyzhankivsky born in the village of Mali Didushychi (today Stryi district of Lviv region) January 24, 1863. He was born in a large family of Greek Catholic priest of Joseph Nyzhankivsky (1836 - 1911), which was a priest of the Greek Catholic parish in the village Mali Didushychi. Then the family moved to the village Zavadiv.
He studied in the nearby village Duliby and later he studied in Drohobych and Lviv gymnasium. Ostap Nyzhankivsky was expelled from the sixth grade of gymnasium and had to enter military service in the Austrian army in Lviv (1882-1885). Ostap has participated in the company “Academic Fraternity”, where he met Ivan Franko and with the composer, conductor and public figure Anatole Vakhnianyn.
The Lviv gymnasium Nyzhankivsky graduated in 1888. Later he studied and graduated from the Greek Catholic Theological Seminary in Lviv (1888 - 1892).
Ostap Nyzhankivsky got married after ordination in 1892 with the Olena Bachynska, what was the daughter of Galician composer Hilary Bachynsky.
The first parish Ostap Nyzhankivsky received in the Berezhany. 1900 –  moved to Stryi. The first parish he had in the village Duliby, later in the village Zavadiv. The first cooperative dairy (in Zavadiv) and the Provincial Home and Dairy Union in Stryi (later renamed Maslosojuz Provincial Dairy Union) has founded in 1907 Ostap Nyzhankivsky.
May 21, 1919, during the Polish–Ukrainian War he was arrested by Polish authorities.
The Polish authorities May 22, 1919, without trial on the outskirts city Stryi was shot Ostap Nyzhankivsky. When Ostap Nyzhankivsky was shot, Poles came to the house of Nyzhankivsky in the village Zavadiv and took all the cattle, poultry, grains. Polish soldiers took off shoes of the murdered priest, took off a gold wedding ring, took the clock.
He was buried in the city Stryi at the cemetery in the family tomb together with his wife Elena Nyzhankivsky (née Bachynska).

Composer and musical activities 
Ostap Nyzhankivsky graduated with honors  from the Prague Conservatory in 1896.

He dedicated much of his energy to developing musical life in Galicia. He founded the music publishing house Muzykalna Biblioteka (1885) and compiled  (Ukrainian-Ruthenian Songbook, 1907). Ostap helped popularise the piano in Western Ukraine, particularly as a solo instrument, but also as an accompanist to Ukrainian Art Song.

His works for choir ‘Hulialy’ (They Danced) and ‘Z Okrushkiv’ (From Crumbs, text by Yuriy Fedkovych) became very popular. He also wrote art songs for solo voice with piano accompaniment, including ‘’ (The Years of Youth Have Passed By); arrangements of folk songs for solo voice or choir; and Vitrohony, a cycle of kolomyika melodies for piano.

Ostap Nyzhankivskyi wrote the carols "God Is Born" (Boh sya rozhdaye), "Heaven and earth" (Nebo i zemlya), "News in Bethlehem" and others...

Political activism 
Ostap Nyzhankovsky was elected to the Galician Diet in 1908–13. He was also elected a member of the UPR, and district commissioner WUPR.
Football team in the city of Stryi Sich was created in 1911. The president of Sich became well known Ukrainian composer Ostap Nyzhankivsky.

References

External links 
 GENi, About Rev. Ostap Nizhankowsky
 Nyzhankivsky, Ostap
  До 150-річчя від дня народження Остапа Нижанківського 
   Славетна Стрийщина, Нижанківський Остап 
 Mali Didushychi village: street map, description

1863 births
1919 deaths
Ukrainian classical composers
Ukrainian Austro-Hungarians
Austro-Hungarian Eastern Catholic priests
People from Lviv Oblast
Classical composers of church music
Eastern Catholic hymnwriters
Austro-Hungarian hymnwriters
Musicians of the Ukrainian diaspora
19th-century Eastern Catholic clergy
20th-century Eastern Catholic clergy
19th-century Austrian clergy
Austrian male classical composers
Ethnic Ukrainian composers
19th-century classical composers
20th-century classical composers
19th-century hymnwriters